Southern Christian University may refer to:

 Universidad Cristiana del Sur, in Costa Rica, Southern Christian University
 Amridge University, in the United States, formerly known as Alabama Christian School of Religion, Southern Christian University, and Regions University